Acheilognathus polylepis is a species of ray-finned fish in the genus Acheilognathus. It is endemic to China.

References

Acheilognathus
Fish described in 1964
Freshwater fish of China